Hatillo or El Hatillo may refer to the following places:

Colombia
 Hatillo de Loba, a municipality in the department of Bolívar

Costa Rica
 Hatillo (district), in San José Canton

Honduras
 El Hatillo, Honduras a colonia in the department of Francisco Morazán

Puerto Rico
 Hatillo, Puerto Rico, a municipality
 Hatillo, Añasco, Puerto Rico, a barrio
 Hatillo, Hatillo, Puerto Rico, a barrio

Venezuela
 El Hatillo Municipality, a municipality in the state of Miranda
 El Hatillo, Miranda, a town in the state of Miranda